Scott Reppert (born December 26, 1960) was an American football player.  He was elected to the College Football Hall of Fame in 2003.

1960 births
Living people
College Football Hall of Fame inductees
Lawrence University alumni
Sportspeople from Appleton, Wisconsin
American football running backs